This is a list of electoral division results for the Australian 1972 federal election.

Overall
This section is an excerpt from 1972 Australian federal election § House of Representatives

New South Wales

Banks 
This section is an excerpt from Electoral results for the Division of Banks § 1972

Barton 
This section is an excerpt from Electoral results for the Division of Barton § 1972

Bennelong 
This section is an excerpt from Electoral results for the Division of Bennelong § 1972

Berowra 
This section is an excerpt from Electoral results for the Division of Berowra § 1972

Blaxland 
This section is an excerpt from Electoral results for the Division of Blaxland § 1972

Bradfield 
This section is an excerpt from Electoral results for the Division of Bradfield § 1972

Calare 
This section is an excerpt from Electoral results for the Division of Calare § 1972

Chifley 
This section is an excerpt from Electoral results for the Division of Chifley § 1972

Cook 
This section is an excerpt from Electoral results for the Division of Cook § 1972

Cowper 
This section is an excerpt from Electoral results for the Division of Cowper § 1972

Cunningham 
This section is an excerpt from Electoral results for the Division of Cunningham § 1972

Darling 
This section is an excerpt from Electoral results for the Division of Darling § 1972

Eden-Monaro 
This section is an excerpt from Electoral results for the Division of Eden-Monaro § 1972

Evans 
This section is an excerpt from Electoral results for the Division of Evans § 1972

Farrer 
This section is an excerpt from Electoral results for the Division of Farrer § 1972

Grayndler 
This section is an excerpt from Electoral results for the Division of Grayndler § 1972

Gwydir 
This section is an excerpt from Electoral results for the Division of Gwydir § 1972

Hughes 
This section is an excerpt from Electoral results for the Division of Hughes § 1972

Hume 
This section is an excerpt from Electoral results for the Division of Hume § 1972

Hunter 
This section is an excerpt from Electoral results for the Division of Hunter § 1972

Kingsford Smith 
This section is an excerpt from Electoral results for the Division of Kingsford Smith § 1972

Lang 
This section is an excerpt from Electoral results for the Division of Lang § 1972

Lowe 
This section is an excerpt from Electoral results for the Division of Lowe § 1972

Lyne 
This section is an excerpt from Electoral results for the Division of Lyne § 1972

Macarthur 
This section is an excerpt from Electoral results for the Division of Macarthur § 1972

Mackellar 
This section is an excerpt from Electoral results for the Division of Mackellar § 1972

Macquarie 
This section is an excerpt from Electoral results for the Division of Macquarie § 1972

Mitchell 
This section is an excerpt from Electoral results for the Division of Mitchell § 1972

New England 
This section is an excerpt from Electoral results for the Division of New England § 1972

Newcastle 
This section is an excerpt from Electoral results for the Division of Newcastle1972

North Sydney 
This section is an excerpt from Electoral results for the Division of North Sydney § 1972

Parramatta 
This section is an excerpt from Electoral results for the Division of Parramatta § 1972

Paterson 
This section is an excerpt from Electoral results for the Division of Paterson § 1972

Phillip 
This section is an excerpt from Electoral results for the Division of Phillip § 1972

Prospect 
This section is an excerpt from Electoral results for the Division of Prospect § 1972

Reid
This section is an excerpt from Electoral results for the Division of Reid § 1972

Richmond 
This section is an excerpt from Electoral results for the Division of Richmond § 1972

Riverina 
This section is an excerpt from Electoral results for the Division of Riverina § 1972

Robertson 
This section is an excerpt from Electoral results for the Division of Robertson § 1972

Shortland 
This section is an excerpt from Electoral results for the Division of Shortland § 1972

St George 
This section is an excerpt from Electoral results for the Division of St George § 1972

Sydney 
This section is an excerpt from Electoral results for the Division of Sydney § 1972

Warringah 
This section is an excerpt from Electoral results for the Division of Warringah § 1972

Wentworth 
This section is an excerpt from Electoral results for the Division of Wentworth § 1972

Werriwa 
This section is an excerpt from Electoral results for the Division of Werriwa § 1972

Victoria

Balaclava 
This section is an excerpt from Electoral results for the Division of Balaclava § 1972

Ballaarat 
This section is an excerpt from Electoral results for the Division of Ballarat § 1972

Batman 
This section is an excerpt from Electoral results for the Division of Batman § 1972

Bendigo 
This section is an excerpt from Electoral results for the Division of Bendigo § 1972

Bruce 
This section is an excerpt from Electoral results for the Division of Bruce § 1972

Burke 
This section is an excerpt from Electoral results for the Division of Burke (1969–2004) § 1972

Casey 
This section is an excerpt from Electoral results for the Division of Casey § 1972

Chisholm 
This section is an excerpt from Electoral results for the Division of Chisholm § 1972

Corangamite 
This section is an excerpt from Electoral results for the Division of Corangamite § 1972

Corio 
This section is an excerpt from Electoral results for the Division of Corio § 1972

Deakin 
This section is an excerpt from Electoral results for the Division of Deakin § 1972

Diamond Valley 
This section is an excerpt from Electoral results for the Division of Diamond Valley § 1972

Flinders 
This section is an excerpt from Electoral results for the Division of Flinders § 1972

Gellibrand 
This section is an excerpt from Electoral results for the Division of Gellibrand § 1972

Gippsland 
This section is an excerpt from Electoral results for the Division of Gippsland § 1972

Henty 
This section is an excerpt from Electoral results for the Division of Henty § 1972

Higgins 
This section is an excerpt from Electoral results for the Division of Higgins § 1972

Holt 
This section is an excerpt from Electoral results for the Division of Holt § 1972

Hotham 
This section is an excerpt from Electoral results for the Division of Hotham § 1972

Indi 
This section is an excerpt from Electoral results for the Division of Indi § 1972

Isaacs 
This section is an excerpt from Electoral results for the Division of Isaacs § 1972

Kooyong 
This section is an excerpt from Electoral results for the Division of Kooyong § 1972

La Trobe 
This section is an excerpt from Electoral results for the Division of La Trobe § 1972

Lalor 
This section is an excerpt from Electoral results for the Division of Lalor § 1972

Mallee 
This section is an excerpt from Electoral results for the Division of Mallee § 1972

Maribyrnong 
This section is an excerpt from Electoral results for the Division of Maribyrnong § 1972

McMillan 
This section is an excerpt from Electoral results for the Division of McMillan § 1972

Melbourne 
This section is an excerpt from Electoral results for the Division of Melbourne § 1972

Melbourne Ports 
This section is an excerpt from Electoral results for the Division of Melbourne Ports § 1972

Murray 
This section is an excerpt from Electoral results for the Division of Murray § 1972

Scullin 
This section is an excerpt from Electoral results for the Division of Scullin § 1972

Wannon 
This section is an excerpt from Electoral results for the Division of Wannon § 1972

Wills 
This section is an excerpt from Electoral results for the Division of Wills § 1972

Wimmera 
This section is an excerpt from Electoral results for the Division of Wimmera § 1972

Queensland

Bowman 
This section is an excerpt from Electoral results for the Division of Bowman § 1972

Brisbane 
This section is an excerpt from Electoral results for the Division of Brisbane § 1972

Capricornia 
This section is an excerpt from Electoral results for the Division of Capricornia § 1972

Darling Downs 
This section is an excerpt from Electoral results for the Division of Darling Downs § 1972

Dawson 
This section is an excerpt from Electoral results for the Division of Dawson § 1972

Fisher 
This section is an excerpt from Electoral results for the Division of Fisher § 1972

Griffith 
This section is an excerpt from Electoral results for the Division of Griffith § 1972

Herbert 
This section is an excerpt from Electoral results for the Division of Herbert § 1972

Kennedy 
This section is an excerpt from Electoral results for the Division of Kennedy § 1972

Leichhardt 
This section is an excerpt from Electoral results for the Division of Leichhardt § 1972

Lilley 
This section is an excerpt from Electoral results for the Division of Lilley § 1972

Maranoa 
This section is an excerpt from Electoral results for the Division of Maranoa § 1972

McPherson 
This section is an excerpt from Electoral results for the Division of McPherson § 1972

Moreton 
This section is an excerpt from Electoral results for the Division of Moreton § 1972

Oxley 
This section is an excerpt from Electoral results for the Division of Oxley § 1972

Petrie 
This section is an excerpt from Electoral results for the Division of Petrie § 1972

Ryan 
This section is an excerpt from Electoral results for the Division of Ryan § 1972

Wide Bay 
This section is an excerpt from Electoral results for the Division of Wide Bay § 1972

South Australia

Adelaide 
This section is an excerpt from Electoral results for the Division of Adelaide § 1972

Angas 
This section is an excerpt from Electoral results for the Division of Angas (1949–1977) § 1949

Barker 
This section is an excerpt from Electoral results for the Division of Barker § 1972

Bonython 
This section is an excerpt from Electoral results for the Division of Bonython § 1972

Boothby 
This section is an excerpt from Electoral results for the Division of Boothby § 1972

Grey 
This section is an excerpt from Electoral results for the Division of Grey § 1972

Hawker 
This section is an excerpt from Electoral results for the Division of Hawker § 1974

Hindmarsh 
This section is an excerpt from Electoral results for the Division of Hindmarsh § 1972

Kingston 
This section is an excerpt from Electoral results for the Division of Kingston § 1972

Port Adelaide 
This section is an excerpt from Electoral results for the Division of Port Adelaide § 1972

Sturt 
This section is an excerpt from Electoral results for the Division of Sturt § 1972

Wakefield 
This section is an excerpt from Electoral results for the Division of Wakefield § 1972

Western Australia

Canning 
This section is an excerpt from Electoral results for the Division of Canning § 1972

Curtin 
This section is an excerpt from Electoral results for the Division of Curtin § 1972

Forrest 
This section is an excerpt from Electoral results for the Division of Forrest § 1972

Fremantle 
This section is an excerpt from Electoral results for the Division of Fremantle § 1972

Kalgoorlie 
This section is an excerpt from Electoral results for the Division of Kalgoorlie § 1972

Moore 
This section is an excerpt from Electoral results for the Division of Moore § 1972

Perth 
This section is an excerpt from Electoral results for the Division of Perth § 1972

Stirling 
This section is an excerpt from Electoral results for the Division of Stirling § 1972

Swan 
This section is an excerpt from Electoral results for the Division of Swan § 1972

Tasmania

Bass 
This section is an excerpt from Electoral results for the Division of Bass § 1972

Braddon 
This section is an excerpt from Electoral results for the Division of Braddon § 1972

Denison 
This section is an excerpt from Electoral results for the Division of Denison § 1972

Franklin 
This section is an excerpt from Electoral results for the Division of Franklin § 1972

Wilmot 
This section is an excerpt from Electoral results for the Division of Wilmot § 1972

Territories

Australian Capital Territory 

This section is an excerpt from Electoral results for the Division of Australian Capital Territory § 1972

Northern Territory 

This section is an excerpt from Electoral results for the Division of Northern Territory § 1972

See also 
 Candidates of the 1972 Australian federal election
 Members of the Australian House of Representatives, 1972–1974

References 

House of Representatives 1972